The Ridge Motorsports Park is located near Shelton, Washington, approximately  northwest of Olympia, Washington.

Ground was broken for the Steve Crawford designed road course on 26 April 2011.

The first event at "The Ridge" was a charity event benefitting local Mason County food banks, held on 10–11 December 2011.

The first official race, a Washington Motorcycle Road Racing Association - WMRRA event, was held on 26 May 2012. Subsequent events include championship racing by regional car and motorcycle sanctioning bodies, lapping events by car clubs, motorcycle organizations, and other events.

For the 2014 season, turn 13 of the original road circuit was reconfigured to mitigate excessive surface degradation, and the terrain surrounding the road circuit underwent an enormous amount of grading and smoothing prior to the application of topsoil and hydro-seeding, to both enhance the appearance of the facility and to manage runoff. New poured in place concrete barrier walls were constructed to replace temporary barriers, curbing was added in several places and additional new paving was completed. Finally, a large spectator viewing area was created on the upper part of the site.

In 2015, an outdoor scale replica kart track was added to the site, named "Olympic Grand Prix", or "OGP". OGP is a 1/5th scale replica of the road circuit, including elevation change. Additionally for 2015, the available paved paddock area was nearly doubled in size.

For 2016, electrical power and water systems were brought on line and a bathroom & shower building was completed. Construction of a new motocross facility called "Ridge MX", also began in the spring of 2016, with initial test laps being run on 6 May 2016. An invitational pre-grand opening test event was held on 1 October 2016 and the official grand opening was held on 29 October 2016.

In 2020, The Ridge Motorsports park added a chicane to the  front straight to slow down superbikes ahead of its inaugural MotoAmerica event on June 26–28. Use of the chicane is optional for each sanctioning body and track day organizer.

Lap records

Unofficial lap records

Official lap records

The fastest official race lap records at The Ridge Motorsports Park are listed as:

References

External links
Ridge Motorsports Park Official website
Maps.google.com
Shelton Mason County Journal
Kitsap Sun
Seattle Times
Hooked On Driving
Washington Motorcycle Road racing Association

Motorsport venues in Washington (state)
Tourist attractions in Mason County, Washington
Sports venues completed in 2011